In communications, noise spectral density (NSD), noise power density, noise power spectral density, or simply noise density (N0) is the power spectral density of noise or the noise power per unit of bandwidth. It has dimension of power over frequency, whose SI unit is watt per hertz (equivalent to watt-second or joule). 
It is commonly used in link budgets as the denominator of the important figure-of-merit ratios, such as carrier-to-noise-density ratio as well as Eb/N0 and Es/N0.

If the noise is one-sided white noise, i.e., constant with frequency, then the total noise power N integrated over a bandwidth B is N = BN0 (for double-sided white noise, the bandwidth is doubled, so N is BN0/2). This is utilized in signal-to-noise ratio calculations.

For thermal noise, its spectral density is given by N0 = kT, where k is the Boltzmann constant in joules per kelvin, and T is the receiver system noise temperature in kelvins.

See also 
Noise-equivalent bandwidth
Spectral density estimation
Welch's method

References 

Noise (electronics)
Frequency-domain analysis
Acoustics